Virginia Leigh Owens (born April 22, 1975) is an American singer, songwriter, author, and blogger. She is known for performing Contemporary Christian music, but has more recently had her songs featured on WB, ABC TV shows, and independent films. Owens had three albums chart on Billboard albums charts in the 2000s.

Career 

Owens was born in Jackson, Mississippi, with poor eyesight and has been blind since the age of three. She earned her bachelor of music education in 1997 from Belmont University, but found that most people were skeptical about hiring a blind music teacher. She entered the music business by writing songs for Michael Puryear's Final Four Publishing, which led to a number of labels competing for her, before she chose Rocketown Records. She concentrated in singing and songwriting and began making CDs, and has been producing them since 1999 with Rocketown Records, a label under Michael W. Smith.  Owens won the Nashville "Lilith Fair '99 Talent Search", which earned her a spot singing at that year's festival, and the following year performed at the Sundance Film Festival.

Her music has been featured on television shows, such as Roswell and Felicity. Owens has also received three Dove awards, including New Artist of the Year (2000) and Inspirational Recorded Song of the Year (2001) for "Blessed" with Rachael Lampa and Cindy Morgan.

In 2005, Owens started a non-profit organization called the Fingerprint Initiative. The organization has worked in conjunction with other groups, such as Compassion International, International Justice Mission, and Habitat for Humanity. Owens was featured on national television, including NBC's Today Show and CNN, for her contribution to help rebuild New Orleans following Hurricane Katrina. Owens released Love Be the Loudest in 2016.

In 2015, Owens released her first book, Transcending Mysteries: Who Is God and What Does He Want From Us?, co-authored with Andrew Greer. Owens is the creator of "How I See It", a video series in which she invites people into her daily life as a blind person, and has served as an adjunct professor in the songwriting department at Belmont University.

In early 2017, Owens created the Love Be the Loudest campaign, whereby a portion of album sales go to support non-profits.

Discography 

 Without Condition – July 20, 1999
 Something More – 2002
 Blueprint (EP) – 2002 (eight tracks; seven remixes, and a one-track preview of Beautiful)
 Beautiful – 2004
 Live From New Orleans – May 3, 2005
 Long Way Home – October 11, 2005
 If You Want Me To: The Best of Ginny Owens – August 8, 2006
 Bring Us Peace – 2006 (Christmas album)
 Say Amen (EP) – 2009 (three-track preview of Say Amen: Hymns and Songs of Faith)
 Say Amen: Hymns and Songs of Faith – October 20, 2009
 Ephemera (EP) – February 2, 2010 (six-track preview of Get In, I'm Driving)
 Get In, I'm Driving – September 13, 2011
 I Know a Secret – November 10, 2014
 Love Be the Loudest – November 18, 2016
 Expressions I: Radiant (EP) - November 20, 2020
 Expressions II: Wonder (EP) - February 12, 2021
 Sing In the Darkness - May 14, 2021

Charts

Albums

References

External links
 
 The Fingerprint Initiative
 Thought Quotient - Interview with Ginny Owens

Blind musicians
Christian music songwriters
Living people
American performers of Christian music
1975 births
Musicians from Jackson, Mississippi
Singer-songwriters from Mississippi
American women singer-songwriters
20th-century American women singers
20th-century American singers
21st-century American women singers
21st-century American singers
Belmont University alumni
Belmont University faculty
Blind academics